Harbour is a state assembly constituency in Chennai district of the Indian state of Tamil Nadu. Its State Assembly Constituency number is 18. It falls under Chennai Central parliamentary constituency during national elections.
Most successful party: DMK (10 times). It is one of the 234 State Legislative Assembly Constituencies in Tamil Nadu, in India.

Overview
As per orders of the Delimitation Commission, No. 18 Harbour Assembly constituency is composed of Ward 23-30,43-44,48-49 & 80 of Greater Chennai Corporation

Madras State

Tamil Nadu

Election results

2021

2016

2011

2006

2001

1996

1991

1991 By-election

1989

1984

1980

1977

1971

1967

1962

1957

1952

References 

 

Assembly constituencies of Tamil Nadu
Chennai district